Duke Erik Birgersson (c. 1250 – 17 December 1275) was a Swedish duke of the House of Bjelbo (Folkungaätten).

Biography
His father was  Birger Magnusson   (Birger Jarl), Jarl of Sweden and de facto ruler of Sweden from 1250–66. 
His mother was Ingeborg of Sweden, daughter of King Eric X of Sweden and sister of King Eric XI of Sweden.

In the conflict between his elder brothers, Valdemar and Magnus, he sided with Magnus. When Magnus had won and been proclaimed king in 1275, he made Erik, Duke of Småland. Erik died shortly thereafter and was buried at Varnhem Abbey together with his father and his father's second wife.

According to the Magnúss saga lagabœtis, Erik called himself "Eirek allz-ekki" because he had no title. Only when Magnus III became king did Erik change his title and call himself "Duke".

When Birger Jarl's grave in Varnhem Abbey was opened and examined in May 2002, osteologist Torbjörn Ahlström from Lund University confirmed that the tomb contained the remains of three people – probably Birger Jarl, his second wife Matilda of Holstein, and Erik. His father's skeleton shows that he was about 172 cm long, while Erik was a few inches longer but with a much thinner build. His muscular attachments were poorly developed. In the vertebrae and sternum there were some signs of pathological changes.

Ancestry

References

Other Sources
Rolf Pipping, Kommentar till Erikskrönikan (Helsingfors 1926).
Erik Birgersson, 1250–1275 Nordic Academic Press 

Eric 1250
13th-century Swedish nobility
1250 births
1275 deaths
House of Bjelbo
Burials at Varnhem Abbey